Raes Jamil Bhurgari (1952 – 2015), was a Pakistani politician who served as a member of the Provincial Assembly of Sindh.

References

1952 births
2015 deaths
Sindh MPAs 2013–2018
Pakistan People's Party politicians
Sindhi people